Nathan Girvan (born 6 November 2002 in Forfar, Angus) is a  professional Scottish darts player who plays in Professional Darts Corporation events. He reached the final of the 2017 BDO World Youth Darts Championship and also in 2019.

Career
In 2016, Girvan topped the Scotland Youth tables after claiming eight titles. In 2017 he reached the final BDO World Youth Darts Championship which took place at the Lakeside Country Club in Frimley Green. The Youth tournament was played in November 2016, in the semifinal he defeated Dutch player Maikel Verberk 4–1, which included a 170 checkout. He faced Justin van Tergouw in the final, he lost 3–0. In October 2018, Girvan booked his place in the final of the 2019 BDO World Youth Darts Championship. He beat England's Connor Arberry 3–2 and played Leighton Bennett in the Final, but he once again lost 3–0. In 2022, Girvan reached the 2022 PDC World Youth Championship final, falling to a 6–1 defeat to Josh Rock.

World Championship results

BDO
 2017: Final (lost to Justin van Tergouw 0–3) (Youth) (sets) 
 2019: Final (lost to Leighton Bennett 0–3) (Youth)

JDC (Youth)

 2019: Last 16: (lost to Keane Barry 2-4) (legs)

External links
 WDF Boys Rankings
 Profile and stats on Darts Database

References

Living people
Scottish darts players
British Darts Organisation players
2002 births